The Tucker School is a historic school building on Vandalsen Drive (one block west of Arkansas Highway 15) in Tucker, Arkansas.  It is a single-story wood-frame structure, with a hip roof, weatherboard siding, and a foundation of brick piers.  On the building's west side, a gable-roofed vestibule projects, with a shed-roof porch in front of it, sheltering the main entrance.  It was built about 1915 to serve the area's white students (African-Americans would not get a school facility until a Rosenwald school was built in 1925), and was apparently in use as a school until the early 1960s, when it was converted into a church.

The building was listed on the National Register of Historic Places in 2005.  At that time, it stood vacant and boarded up.

See also
National Register of Historic Places listings in Jefferson County, Arkansas

References

Buildings and structures in Jefferson County, Arkansas
National Register of Historic Places in Jefferson County, Arkansas
School buildings completed in 1915
School buildings on the National Register of Historic Places in Arkansas
1915 establishments in Arkansas